Pueblo West High School is a public high school located in Pueblo West, Colorado, United States. It is part of the Pueblo Metropolitan Statistical Area. The school opened its doors in 1997 as a new extension of Pueblo School District 70.

Pueblo West High School became an International Baccalaureate world school in 2009, offering the IB Diploma Programme.

The institution is currently headed by Jamison Wagner and has a student enrollment of approximately 1250.

The Pueblo West High School football team won the Colorado 4A State Championship in 2007.

References

Public high schools in Colorado
Schools in Pueblo County, Colorado
Educational institutions established in 1997
1997 establishments in Colorado
International Baccalaureate schools in Colorado